Cazal is a luxury sunglass designer based in Germany which manufactures the Legends line of sunglasses, created by Austrian designer Cari Zalloni.

History
Cari Zalloni founded Cazal in 1975 with his business partner Günter Böttcher. Zalloni wanted to make sunglasses with mismatched lenses, a design detail that recently became popular at Virgil Abloh’s Spring/Summer 2021 show for Louis Vuitton. Reportedly, the sunglasses are worn by Hussein bin Talal, the former King of Jordan, and Hosni Mubara, the former president of Egypt. Cazal sunglasses have been especially popular among hip hop artists, including Run DMC and Rick Ross. Rick Ross has a facial tattoo of the Cazal logo.

In 1985, the a Philly rap group named the Cazal Boys made a song called “Snatchin Cazals.” The company introduced more frames in 2015.

References

External links
Official Website

Sunglasses
Eyewear brands of Germany
Eyewear companies of Germany